The Young Harris College Historic District in Young Harris, Georgia is a  historic district that was listed on the National Register of Historic Places in 1983.

It includes the two oldest buildings on the campus of Young Harris College: Sharp Hall (1912) and the Susan B. Harris Chapel (1892) as well as grounds including historic landscape features.

References

Historic districts on the National Register of Historic Places in Georgia (U.S. state)
Buildings and structures completed in 1892
Buildings and structures completed in 1912
National Register of Historic Places in Towns County, Georgia